A monowheel, or uniwheel, is a one-wheeled single-track vehicle similar to a unicycle. 

Hand-cranked and pedal-powered monowheels were patented and built in the late 19th century; most built in the 20th and 21st century have been motorized. Some modern builders refer to these vehicles as monocycles, though that term is also sometimes used to describe motorized unicycles.

The world speed record for a motorized monowheel is 98.464 km/h (61.18 mph).

Stability
Similar to bicycles, monowheels are stable in the direction of travel, but have limited horizontal stability. This is in contrast to unicycles which are unstable in both directions. Monowheels have also been found to have a lower speed required for stability when compared to unicycles.

A monowheel remains upright due to gyroscopic effects, but its lack of stability makes it highly dependent on forward momentum and the balance of the rider, who must maintain stability while steering. Over the history of the monowheel, various stability enhancements have been tried such as support struts (Green & Dyer, 1869), skids and propellers (D'Harlingue Propeller-Driven Monowheel, 1914), as well as gyroscopes, fins, and rudders (The McLean V8 Monowheel, 2003). Many riders choose to control stability when at a stop by putting their feet on the ground, similar to bicycles and motorcycles.

Variants and related vehicles
There have been many proposals for variants or uses, such as a horse-drawn monowheel or a monowheel tank.

An electric monowheel called Dynasphere was tested in 1932 in the United Kingdom.

In 1971, an American inventor named Kerry McLean built his first monocycle (aka monowheel). In 2000, he built a larger version, the McLean Rocket Roadster powered by a Buick V-8 engine, which subsequently crashed in 2001 during the initial test run.  McLean survived and proceeded to build over 25 different variations of his version of the monocycle, from pedal powered models, 5HP models, all the way up to V8 powered models. In 2010, Nokia used two of McLean's monocycles in their commercials promoting the new Nokia SatNav smartphone.

One variant called a RIOT wheel was presented at Burning Man in 2003. It involves the passengers sitting in front of the wheel and being balanced by a heavy counterweight inside the wheel. Rather than the typical ring drive, this vehicle is powered through a sprocket attached to the spokes.

A company in the Netherlands began taking custom orders for a monocycle variant called the Wheelsurf in 2007.

A related vehicle is the diwheel or the dicycle, in which the rider is suspended between or inside of a pair of large wheels placed side by side. An example of this would be the character Axel from the Twisted Metal series of video games published by Sony.

See also

 Cyr wheel
 Dynasphere (vehicle)
 Hubless wheel
 Kugelpanzer – monowheel tank
 Monowheel tractor
 Onewheel
 Outline of cycling
 Self-balancing unicycle
 Unicycle
 Uno (dicycle)

References

External links

Video of Guinness world speed record
Channel 4's Scrapheap Challenge page on the Monowheel
Monovelo, the 2008 Beijing Olympic Games Monowheel
"Speedy New Motor-Hoop Amazes Italians", Popular Science, December 1924, page 40, scanned by Google Books
"Amazing New Motor-Driven Hoop May Be Car of the Future", Popular Science, May 1932, front cover and page 63, scanned by Google Books
"War Tank on One Wheel, Operated by One Man", Popular Science, November 1933, front cover and page 47, scanned by Google Books
Cycle World: Circle Cycle
Impact Lab: History of the World’s Craziest Invention - The Monowheel
Douglas Self's monowheel page

Cycle types